Jan Ladislav Rubeš CM (6 June 1920 – 29 June 2009) was a Czech-Canadian bass opera singer and actor.

Life and career

Rubeš was born in Volyně, Czechoslovakia, to Ružena (née Kellnerová) and Jan Rubeš. Not long after World War II, he graduated from the Prague Conservatoire and joined the Prague Opera House as a bass singer. In 1948, he won first prize at the Geneva International Music Festival and emigrated to Canada at the end of the year to pursue a career in a wider sphere. Beginning as a singer with the Canadian Opera Company, he subsequently directed and became director of touring, before switching to radio and television, where he became well known as an actor and presenter in Canada. He is noted for his portrayal of Amish patriarch Eli Lapp in Peter Weir's major-market film Witness and Jan in D2: The Mighty Ducks.

Family
On 22 September 1950, Rubeš married actress Susan Douglas. The couple had three sons: Christopher (died 1996), Jonathan, and Anthony. They remained married until his death in 2009.

Death
On 29 June 2009, Rubeš died following a stroke at Toronto General Hospital.

Awards and recognition
 1989: nominee, 10th Genie Awards, Best Actor, Something About Love
 1990: winner, Earle Grey Award
 1995: appointed Member, Order of Canada

Filmography

Motion pictures

1950: Forbidden Journey - Jan Bartik
1963: The Incredible Journey - Carl Nurmi
1975: Lions for Breakfast - Ivan
1980: Mr. Patman - Vrakettas
1981: The Amateur - Kaplan
1981: Your Ticket Is No Longer Valid - Psychiatrist
1983: Utilities - Mort
1985: Witness - Eli Lapp
1985: One Magic Christmas - Santa Claus
1987: Dead of Winter - Dr. Joseph Lewis
1988: Blood Relations - Andreas
1988: The Outside Chance of Maximilian Glick - Augustus Glick
1988: This Kiss - Gordon Tobin
1988: Something About Love - Stan Olynyk
1989: The Experts - Illyich
1989: Cold Front - Zoubov
1989: Blind Fear - Lasky
1990: Divided Loyalties
1990: Courage Mountain - Grandfather
1990: The Amityville Curse - Priest
1991: Class Action - Pavel
1991: Deceived - Tomasz
1991: On My Own - The Colonel
1992: Don Gio - Journalist No. 2
1994: Boozecan - Pops
1994: D2: The Mighty Ducks - Jan
1994: Mesmer - Prof. Stoerk
1995: Roommates - Bolek Krupa
1996: Never Too Late - Joseph
1997: Bach Cello Suite #4: Sarabande - Dr. Kassovitz
1998: Music from Another Room - Louis Klammer
1998: The White Raven - Markus Strand
1999: Snow Falling on Cedars - Ole Jurgensen
1999: Nightmare Man - Evan Hannibal
2000: Believe - Jason Stiles
2001: Anthrax - Arthur Kowalski
2002: The Burial Society - Marvin Telekunsky
2003: The Republic of Love - Strom
2004: Daniel and the Superdogs - The Colonel

Television movies
1975: Deadly Harvest
1977: The Day My Granddad Died
1978: Catsplay
1985: Charlie Grant's War - Jacob
1985: Murder by Reason of Insanity - Giorgi Denerenko
1986: The Marriage Bed - Max Ehrlich
1988: No Blame - Dr. Bloomer
1988: Two Men - Michael Barna
1990: Descending Angel - Bishop Dancu
1992: Devlin - Vittorio Di Fabrizi
1994: The Birds II: Land's End - Karl
1994: Lamb Chop in the Haunted Studio - Phantom
1995: Serving in Silence: The Margarethe Cammermeyer Story - Far
1997: Flood: A River's Rampage
1999: What Katy Did - Dr. Reinhart
2000: The Christmas Secret - Andree
2005: Our Fathers - Pope John Paul

Television series
1963: The Forest Rangers - Jaworski / Gregor Kowalski
1970: Castle Zaremba - Col. Kazimir Zaremba
1983: Vandenberg - Lewis Vanderberg
1975-1983: Guess What (host)
1985: Kane & Abel (miniseries) - The Polish Consul
1985: Murder in Space - Gregory Denarenko
1986: Kay O'Brien - Dr. Josef Wallach
1986: Crossings (miniseries) - Isaac Zimmerman
1988: Sharon, Lois & Bram's Elephant Show (as a special guest) - Jan Rubes
1990: Street Legal (season 4, Episode 4X13 "Leon's Story") - Arthur Robinovitch
1990: Max Glick - Augustus Glick
1992-1993: By Way of the Stars (miniseries) - Hausierer Nathan
1996: The X-Files (Episodes Tunguska [uncredited] and Terma) - Vassily Peskow
1996-1998: Due South - Dr. Mort Gustafson
1997: The Third Twin (miniseries)
1999: The Outer Limits (Episode, "Tribunal") - Robert Greene / Older Karl Rademacher
2000: Stargate SG-1 (season 3, Episode 21 "Crystal Skull") - Nicholas Ballard

References

External links
 
 
 

1920 births
2009 deaths
People from Volyně
Czech male film actors
Czechoslovak male opera singers
Czech male stage actors
Czech male television actors
Czechoslovak emigrants to Canada
Canadian male film actors
Canadian male television actors
Canadian male voice actors
Members of the Order of Canada
Academic staff of University of Windsor
Academic staff of Wilfrid Laurier University
Czech emigrants to Canada
Best Supporting Actor in a Drama Series Canadian Screen Award winners